Pumas CU UNAM, also known as "Pumas Dorados", "Pumas", or "Universidad" is the varsity American football team representing the National Autonomous University of Mexico (Spanish: Universidad Nacional Autonoma de Mexico, or UNAM). It is one of the oldest and most important teams in Mexico. They maintain a fierce rivalry with teams from the National Polytechnic Institute (Spanish: Instituto Politécnico Nacional, or IPN) particularly with its Miguel Hidalgo-based team from Santo Tomás, Águilas Blancas.

History
The team was founded in 1927 by a group of students led by the Noriega brothers, but it wasn't until 1931 when Pumas was officially the varsity team of the National Autonomous University of Mexico. In addition, American oil magnate Harry Ford Sinclair sponsored the team with generous donations until 1935. In the early years, Pumas had a long string of consecutive championships from 1933 to 1945 (including an appearance in the 1945 Sun Bowl; this was followed by the so-called "Golden Age" of 1946 to 1957. Between the years 1958 and 1969 the team consolidated its position within ONEFA, Mexico's league of American football. For the period 1970–1980 the university authorities decided to disband the team and create three teams (Cóndores/Condors; Aguilas Reales/Royal Eagles; and Guerreros Aztecas/Aztec Warriors), from 1981 to 1990 only the Cóndores could reclaim the tradition of the Pumas and win championships. In 1998, the University government decided to reduce to one team per campus and created Pumas CU and Acatlan. Unfortunately, conditions within the league and the existence of other powerful newcomer squads undermined the strength and dominance of the team. Its first position tradition vanished rapidly during the seasons of 1998 to 2007. From 1969 until 2002, the Pumas Dorados team consisted of a selection of the best players of all UNAM teams. These teams didn't play any regular season games, but rather the Pumas Dorados used to play a Classic game against the Burros Blancos at the end of season, until 2002 when this event was suspended.

Championships

National championships

ONEFA championships

 In 2008 was created another league for the major category in Mexico (Liga Mayor) and the National Championship is shared in 2 leagues since then. 
+ This is not the same team as previous Pumas Dorados teams. Championships in 2008 and 2010 were won by the Main Campus (CU). There is another Pumas team located in Acatlan Campus. Pumas Dorados  currently represents  a selection of the best players of both Pumas teams and the last selection was made in 2002 and played against a selection of the best players of the IPN.

Rivalry
The team has an historic rivalry with Aguilas Blancas IPN, due to both of them being the biggest public universities in the country. More recently, major rivalries arose with Borregos Salvajes ITESM, Borregos Salvajes CEM, Aztecas UDLAP and Auténticos Tigres UANL.

Venue
The team plays at the Estadio Olímpico Universitario in Mexico City, inaugurated in 1952 with the game between Pumas and Burros Blancos. Capacity: 72000.

Players

Players in the CFL
As of January 2020, the following players have played at least one game with a Canadian Football League team.

Andrés Salgado, WR, Calgary Stampeders

External links
  tackleo.com American Football in Mexico

References

National Autonomous University of Mexico
National Autonomous University of Mexico athletics
American football teams in Mexico
Sports teams in Mexico City
1927 establishments in Mexico
American football teams established in 1927